"When You Know What Love Is" is a song by British singer Craig David. It was written by David, Gary Barlow, Fraser T. Smith, and Janee Bennett for his eighth studio album 22 (2022), while production was helmed by Smith. The song was released as a digital download on 31 May 2019. Initially announced to serve as the album's lead single, it was later omitted from the final track listing. "When You Know What Love Is" peaked at number 52 on the UK Singles Chart.

Background
In a press release, David said that the track was "about the initial undeniable spark you get when something feels right - wanting to hold on to that feeling and seeing how it can develop."

Music video
A music video to accompany the release of "When You Know What Love Is" was first released onto YouTube on 1 July 2019 at a total length of three minutes and twenty-five seconds. Directed by Charlie Sarsfield, it was filmed in Ibiza.

Track listing
All tracks written by Craig David, Gary Barlow, Fraser T. Smith, and Janee Bennett.

Notes
  signifies an additional producer

Credits and personnel 
Credits adapted from the liner notes of "When You Know What Love Is."

Janee Bennett – writer
Gary Barlow – background vocalist, writer
Paul Carr – assistant engineer
Craig David – lead vocalist, writer

Phoebe Edwards – background vocalist
Manon Grandjean – mixing engineer
Stuart Hawkes – mastering engineer
Fraser T. Smith – producer, writer

Charts

Release history

References

2019 songs
Craig David songs
Songs written by Craig David
Songs written by Jin Jin (musician)
Songs written by Gary Barlow
Songs written by Fraser T. Smith